Immer noch Mensch is the third studio album by German recording artist Tim Bendzko, released by Sony Music Columbia on 21 October 2016 in German-speaking Europe.

Track listing

Charts

Certifications

Release history

References

External links
 

2016 albums
Tim Bendzko albums